Dana Hazen Stone (April 18, 1939; disappeared April 6, 1970) was an American photojournalist who worked for CBS, United Press International, and Associated Press during the Vietnam War.

Biography 
Stone first traveled to Vietnam in 1965. Before arriving he bought a Nikon, his first camera, in Hong Kong. After arriving in Saigon he met Henri Huet who showed him how to load film into the camera. He became friends with fellow photographers and journalists including Sean Flynn, Tim Page, Henri Huet, John Steinbeck IV, Perry Deane Young, Nik Wheeler, Chas Gerretsen, and others. Dana started freelancing for UPI and later became a staffer with the AP. He soon became a combat photographer of note while going on missions with the Green Berets from his base in Da Nang.

He and his wife Louise Smizer left Saigon for Europe in 1969, driving a VW Camper from India overland to Lapland in Sweden where, for a short time, he became a Lumberjack.

Stone was working as a freelancer for CBS News in Laos when he was called back to Saigon in March 1970 to work as a combat cameraman with John Laurence who was making a documentary that would become The World of Charlie Company. He spent 5 days working on the documentary before being sent by CBS to Phnom Penh on March 28 to cover the aftermath of the Cambodian coup.

Disappearance 
On April 6, 1970, Stone and his colleague Sean Flynn were captured by the People's Army of Vietnam in the Kampong Cham province after leaving Phnom Penh on rented Honda motorbikes looking to find the front lines of fighting in Cambodia. Investigations by fellow photojournalist Tim Page, reported in the UK Sunday Times on March 24, 1991, indicate that Stone and Flynn were taken first to the village of Sangke Kaong, and then to other villages before being handed to the Khmer Rouge. Page tracked down an almost-empty grave in a village known as Bei Met in which two foreigners allegedly had been buried. Forensic examination of the few remains left in the grave suggested they belonged to a tall man and a short man – consistent with the appearance of Flynn and Stone respectively – and that both had died violently. However, in 2003, the Pentagon's Central Identification Lab in Hawaii confirmed by DNA testing that the remains found by Tim Page were actually of Clyde McKay, a boat hijacker, and Larry Humphrey, an army deserter; both were a part of the SS Columbia Eagle incident.

Stone and Flynn's disappearance is chronicled in Perry Deane Young's 1975 memoir Two of the Missing. A 1991 film, Danger on the Edge of Town, recounted Tim Page's "search to discover the fate of his friends Sean Flynn and Dana Stone".

Stone's younger brother, John Thomas Stone, joined the U.S. Army in 1971, soon after graduating from high school, reportedly due in part to a desire to discover what had happened to his brother. He later served as a medic in the Vermont National Guard and was killed by friendly fire on March 29, 2006, when the 52-year-old sergeant was on his third tour in the war in Afghanistan.

See also 
 Declared death in absentia
 John Dawson Dewhirst
 List of journalists killed and missing in the Vietnam War
 Lists of people who disappeared
 Mayaguez Incident

References

External links 
 

1939 births
1971 deaths
1970 crimes
1970s missing person cases
American war correspondents of the Vietnam War
American photojournalists
Missing person cases in Cambodia
People executed by the Khmer Rouge
People from Windsor County, Vermont
People murdered in Cambodia
Photography in Cambodia
War photographers killed while covering the Vietnam War